Friday the Thirteenth is a 1949 West German comedy crime film directed by Erich Engels and starring Fritz Kampers, Angelika Hauff, and Fita Benkhoff.

It was made by Terra Film in 1944, but was not released before the end of the Second World War. It received its much delayed premiere in 1949. It was one of several Nazi-era productions that were given releases in the years after the end of the war.

The film's sets were designed by the art director Artur Günther.

Cast

See also
 Überläufer

References

Bibliography

External links 
 

1949 films
1940s crime comedy films
German crime comedy films
West German films
1940s German-language films
Films directed by Erich Engels
Terra Film films
German black-and-white films
1949 comedy films
Films scored by Ludwig Schmidseder
1940s German films